The Women's 200 Freestyle at the 10th FINA World Swimming Championships (25m) took place 19 December 2010 in Dubai, United Arab Emirates. 72 individuals swam in the preliminary heats of the event, with the top-8 advancing to a final that evening.

Records
Prior to the competition, the existing world and championship records were as follows.

The following records were established during the competition:

Results

Heats

Final

References

Freestyle 0200 metre, Women's
World Short Course Swimming Championships
2010 in women's swimming